Don Quixote, Op. 35 is a tone poem by Richard Strauss for cello, viola, and orchestra. Subtitled Phantastische Variationen über ein Thema ritterlichen Charakters (Fantastic Variations on a Theme of Knightly Character), the work is based on the novel Don Quixote de la Mancha by Miguel de Cervantes. Strauss composed this work in Munich in 1897. The premiere took place in Cologne on 8 March 1898, with Friedrich Grützmacher as the cello soloist and Franz Wüllner as the conductor.

The score is 45 minutes long and is written in theme and variations form, with the solo cello representing Don Quixote, and the solo viola, tenor tuba, and bass clarinet depicting his squire Sancho Panza. The second variation depicts an episode where Don Quixote encounters a herd of sheep and perceives them as an approaching army. Strauss uses dissonant flutter-tonguing in the brass to emulate the bleating of the sheep, an early instance of this extended technique. Strauss later quoted this passage in his music for Le bourgeois gentilhomme, at the moment a servant announces the dish of "leg of mutton in the Italian style".  Graham Phipps has examined the structure of the work in terms of Arnold Schoenberg's ideas of 'surface harmonic logic' and 'developing variation'.

Instrumentation
The work is scored for a large orchestra consisting of the following forces: piccolo, 2 flutes, 2 oboes, English horn, 2 clarinets in B (2nd doubling E-flat clarinet), bass clarinet, 3 bassoons, contrabassoon, 6 horns in F, 3 trumpets in D and F, 3 trombones, tenor tuba in B (often performed on euphonium), tuba, timpani, bass drum, snare drum, cymbals, triangle, tambourine, wind machine, and strings: harp, violins i, ii, violas (including an extensive solo viola part), violoncellos (including an extensive solo violoncello part), double basses.

Structure

 Introduction: Mäßiges Zeitmaß. Thema mäßig. "Don Quichotte verliert über der Lektüre der Ritterromane seinen Verstand und beschließt, selbst fahrender Ritter zu werden" ("Don Quixote loses his sanity after reading novels about knights, and decides to become a knight-errant")
 Theme: Mäßig. "Don Quichotte, der Ritter von der traurigen Gestalt" ("Don Quixote, knight of the sorrowful countenance")
 Maggiore: "Sancho Panza"
 Variation I: Gemächlich. "Abenteuer an den Windmühlen" ("Adventure at the Windmills")
 Variation II: Kriegerisch. "Der siegreiche Kampf gegen das Heer des großen Kaisers Alifanfaron" ("The victorious struggle against the army of the great emperor Alifanfaron") [actually a flock of sheep]
 Variation III: Mäßiges Zeitmaß. "Gespräch zwischen Ritter und Knappen" ("Dialogue between Knight and Squire")
 Variation IV: Etwas breiter. "Unglückliches Abenteuer mit einer Prozession von Büßern" ("Unhappy adventure with a procession of pilgrims")
 Variation V: Sehr langsam. "Die Waffenwache" ("The knight's vigil")
 Variation VI: Schnell. "Begegnung mit Dulzinea" ("The Meeting with Dulcinea")
 Variation VII: Ein wenig ruhiger als vorher. "Der Ritt durch die Luft" ("The Ride through the Air")
 Variation VIII: Gemächlich. "Die unglückliche Fahrt auf dem venezianischen Nachen" ("The unhappy voyage in the enchanted boat")
 Variation IX: Schnell und stürmisch. "Kampf gegen vermeintliche Zauberer" ("Battle with the magicians")
 Variation X: Viel breiter. "Zweikampf mit dem Ritter vom blanken Mond" ("Duel with the knight of the bright moon")
 Finale: Sehr ruhig. "Wieder zur Besinnung gekommen" ("Coming to his senses again" – Death of Don Quixote)

In film 
The first and second variations are featured in the soundtrack of The Lobster, a 2015 film directed by Yorgos Lanthimos.

Selected recordings
 1932 – Alfred Wallenstein (cello), Rene Pollain (viola), Sir Thomas Beecham (conductor), New York Philharmonic
 1933 – Enrico Mainardi (cello), Karl Reitz (viola), Richard Strauss (conductor), Staatskapelle Berlin
 1938 – Emanuel Feuermann (cello), Carlton Cooley (viola), Arturo Toscanini (conductor), NBC Symphony Orchestra (an unofficial release)
 1941 – Gregor Piatigorsky (cello), Fritz Reiner (conductor), Pittsburgh Symphony Orchestra
 1943 – Joseph Schuster (cello), William Lincer, viola, Leonard Bernstein (conductor), New York Philharmonic (this was Bernstein's debut, and not released as an official recording until many years after his death)
 1953 – Frank Miller (cello), Carlton Cooley (viola), Arturo Toscanini (conductor), NBC Symphony Orchestra (the official Toscanini release)
 1959 – Fritz Reiner, Chicago Symphony Orchestra – RCA
 1963 – Lorne Munroe (cello), Carlton Cooley (viola), Eugene Ormandy (conductor), Philadelphia Orchestra
 1964 – Mstislav Rostropovich (cello), L. Dvoskin (viola), Kirill Kondrashin (conductor), Moscow Philharmonic Orchestra
 1965 – Pierre Fournier (cello), Giusto Cappone (viola), Herbert von Karajan, Berlin Philharmonic – Deutsche Grammophon
 1972 – Lorne Munroe (cello), William Lincer (viola), Leonard Bernstein (conductor), New York Philharmonic
 1973 – János Starker (cello), Richard Parnas (viola), Antal Doráti (conductor), National Symphony Orchestra Washington DC, live in New York
 1975 – Mstislav Rostropovich (cello), Ulrich Koch (viola), Herbert von Karajan (conductor), Berlin Philharmonic – EMI
 1986 – Yo-Yo Ma (cello), Seiji Ozawa (conductor), Boston Symphony Orchestra – Sony Classical
 1986 video – Antônio Meneses (cello), Wolfram Christ (viola), Herbert von Karajan (conductor), Berlin Philharmonic – SONY
 2003 – John Sharp (cello), Charles Pikler (viola), Daniel Barenboim (conductor), Chicago Symphony Orchestra

References

External links

Orquesta Sinfónica de Galicia, Dennis Russell Davies conductor, Pablo Ferrández violoncello and Francisco Regozo viola. Live performance.

Tone poems by Richard Strauss
Music based on Don Quixote
1897 compositions
Humor in classical music
Compositions for cello and orchestra